The Stiklestad United Lutheran Church is a historic church in Brandrup Township, Minnesota, United States, completed in 1898.  It was listed on the National Register of Historic Places in 1980 for having local significance in the themes of architecture, exploration/settlement, and religion.  It was nominated as a symbol of the area's Norwegian immigrants and the role religion played in the cultural persistence of this and many other European enclaves that dominated part or all of many Minnesota counties, as well as for being a well-preserved example of Carpenter Gothic church design.

History
The area was settled by Norwegian immigrants mostly hailing from around Trondheim.  The church was built from 1897 to 1898 by members of the congregation, with local carpenter Sam Christenson serving as contractor and foreman.  The church was named for Stiklestad Church in Norway.

See also
 List of Lutheran churches
 National Register of Historic Places listings in Wilkin County, Minnesota

References

Buildings and structures in Wilkin County, Minnesota
Carpenter Gothic church buildings in Minnesota
Churches completed in 1898
Lutheran churches in Minnesota
Churches on the National Register of Historic Places in Minnesota
Norwegian-American culture in Minnesota
1898 establishments in Minnesota
National Register of Historic Places in Wilkin County, Minnesota